John Burrow may refer to:
 J. W. Burrow (John Wyon Burrow), English historian of intellectual history
 John F. Burrow, American politician in Mississippi
 John Burrow (literary scholar), British scholar of English literature

See also
 John Burrows (disambiguation)